Elpidio "Pidi" Frani Barzaga Jr. (born March 25, 1950) is a Filipino lawyer and politician from the province of Cavite. He is the incumbent Congressman of Dasmariñas and is the mayor of the said city. During the 2020 House hearing on ABS-CBN franchise renewal, Barzaga infamously cited Wikipedia as his source. On July 10, 2020, Barzaga is one of the 70 representatives who voted to reject the franchise renewal of ABS-CBN. He is the congressman under National Unity Party (NUP).

Education
Barzaga graduated as valedictorian of the Class of 1966 of Immaculate Conception Academy. After earning a Bachelor of Science degree cum laude from the San Beda College, he completed his Bachelor of Law degree from the Far Eastern University magna cum laude.

After college, he taught law at the Far Eastern University Institute of Law from 1976 to 1992 and was a Bar Reviewer in Civil Law from 1983 to 1992.

Political career

Mayor of Dasmariñas
Barzaga was elected Municipal Mayor of Dasmariñas in 1998 and served in that office for nine years. On 2007, he defeated incumbent representative Gilbert Remulla for the House of Representatives seat for the Second District of Cavite. His wife Jennifer succeeded Barzaga as mayor of Dasmariñas.

Congressman
In the House of Representatives, Barzaga serves as vice chairman of the Committee on Constitutional Amendments, Local Government, and Revision of Laws and is a member of the Committees on Appropriations, Civil Service and Professional Regulation, Good Government, Human Rights, Justice, Population and Family Relations, Public Works and Highways, Science and Technology, Suffrage and Electoral Reforms, Transportation, Veteran Affairs and Welfare and the Special Committee on Southern Tagalog Development.

He figured prominently on issues concerning Meralco, Sulpicio Lines, the Impeachment Complaint, and Alabang Boys. He has authored and sponsored several bills including an act converting the Municipality of Dasmariñas into a component city, a resolution requesting an investigation into oil prices, a resolution requesting an investigation into bidding on updating the Subic Bay Freeport Zone  master development plan, and a resolution requesting an investigation of environmental issues during the construction of a casino in Subic Bay Freeport Zone.

In 2009, along with fellow representatives of Cavite Joseph Emilio Abaya and Jesus Crispin Remulla, Barzaga co-authored an act, unofficially titled The Cavite Congressional Reapportionment Act of 2009, bringing the representatives of Cavite from three to seven.

In 2010 congressional elections he was won via landslide victory against his close opponent Ramon Campos of the Nacionalista Party.

Serving as part of the House Prosecution panel, Barzaga was responsible for Article II of the 2012 Impeachment of SC Chief Justice Renato Corona. Ironically, he is paired against his Remedial law professor from his law school days, former Assoc. Justice Serafin Cuevas, who is serving as lead defense counsel.

In 2013 elections, he sought reelection for his last term under the National Unity Party as well to Liberal Party.

In 2015, he was criticized by the National Union of Journalists of the Philippines for threatening to cite Christine F. Herrera of The Standard in contempt, after the latter refused to name her sources of the alleged payola given to solons to railroad the passage of the controversial Bangsamoro Basic Law or BBL. Barzaga is one of the solons who voted "Yes" for the passage of BBL at the committee level.

He supported the candidacy of Mar Roxas in the 2016 Philippine elections. Barzaga predicted that Grace Poe will not run as the running mate of Roxas, and instead will run under the Nationalist Peoples Coalition, with the idea of a Roxas-Aquino tandem to challenge the Grace-Chiz tandem. Barzaga declined to run for Governor against Remulla, and instead ran for Mayor of Dasmariñas.

Denial of the renewal of ABS-CBN franchise
In 2020, Barzaga was prominently featured in the congressional hearings for ABS-CBN's "new 25-year franchise" issue when he cited Wikipedia as his source of information. He is one of the 70 representatives who voted "yes" to "kill" (deny) the franchise renewal of ABS-CBN, in favor of the report from Technical Working Group.

Awards and honors
In 2008, he was the recipient of the Outstanding Alumnus Award from the Far Eastern University on the celebration of its 80th Founding Anniversary and the Most Distinguished Bedan Award from the San Beda College. He was acknowledged as one of the Most Outstanding Congressman of 2008 by the Congress Magazine.

Personal life
He is married to Jennifer Austria Barzaga, a registered nurse. They have three sons – Francisco ("Kiko"), Elpidio III, and Lorenzo. Their son, Francisco, is a councilor of the city since 2019.

Genealogy Father's side

Genealogy Mother's side
Elpidio Frani Barzaga Jr. was the son of Elpidio Mangubat Barzaga Sr. 
Elpidio Mangubat Barzaga Sr. was  the son of Bernarda Sanchez Mangubat (born 1875) of Dasmarinas and Francisco Barzaga. Bernarda was the brother of Nicholas Sanchez Mangubat (Born 1859) in Marshall Island Spanish East Indies.
Bernarda Mangubat was the son of Don Leterio(Eleuterio) Mangubat a native of Dasmarinas and former Gobernadorcillo and Juez de Paz of the pueblo

See also
National Telecommunications Commission (Philippines)
ABS-CBN franchise renewal controversy

References

|-

|-

1950 births
Living people
People from Dasmariñas
Members of the House of Representatives of the Philippines from Cavite
20th-century Filipino lawyers
Academic staff of Far Eastern University
San Beda University alumni
National Unity Party (Philippines) politicians
Lakas–CMD politicians
Kabalikat ng Malayang Pilipino politicians
Mayors of places in Cavite
Duterte administration personnel